Cross Church is a Baptist multi-site megachurch based in Springdale, Arkansas. It is affiliated with the Southern Baptist Convention. Across its three campuses, Cross Church is one of the largest churches in the state of Arkansas. The senior pastor is Nick Floyd, son of Ronnie Floyd- longtime senior pastor of Cross Church for thirty years when he left to become full-time CEO of the Southern Baptist Convention.

History
The church was founded in the 1870 as Landmark Liberty Baptist Church. In 1910, the church was renamed First Baptist Church Of Springdale. In 1976, it founded the Shiloh Christian School.  

In 2001, it opened a campus in Rogers (Pinnacle Hills).  The church changed its name from First Baptist Church of Springdale to Cross Church in 2010. 

The church changed its name from First Baptist Church of Springdale to Cross Church in 2002.  

In 2018, it claimed a weekly attendance of 8,959 people. 

In 2019, Nick Floyd became the senior pastor, after the departure of his father Ronnie Floyd.

References

External links
 Cross Church
 The Summit, Business Persons' Luncheon
 Shiloh Christian School

Baptist churches in Arkansas
Evangelical megachurches in the United States
Churches in Washington County, Arkansas
Southern Baptist Convention churches
Buildings and structures in Springdale, Arkansas
Baptist multisite churches